Bracken's World is an American drama television series that aired on NBC from September 19, 1969, to December 25, 1970. The series was created and produced by Dorothy Kingsley. The Lettermen performed the second-season theme song "Worlds".

Synopsis

The series centers on a powerful head of Century Studios and a group of up-and-coming starlets. 

During the first season, Eleanor Parker received top billing as Sylvia Caldwell, executive secretary to John Bracken (voice-acted in the first season by Warren Stevens), who was sometimes heard, but never seen. Parker left the series after the first 16 episodes, citing the limited nature of her role.   When the second season began, Leslie Nielsen joined the cast to portray Bracken.

Other cast members included Elizabeth Allen, Dennis Cole, Jeanne Cooper, Peter Haskell, Linda Harrison, Karen Jensen, Madlyn Rhue, and Laraine Stephens. Guest stars who appeared in various episodes of Bracken's World included Jack Albertson, Anne Baxter, Joseph Campanella, Gary Collins, Shelley Fabares, Sally Field, Lee Grant, Arthur Hill. Carolyn Jones, Lee Majors, Monte Markham, Tim Matheson, Darren McGavin, Ricardo Montalbán, Lois Nettleton, Lane Bradbury, Stuart Whitman, Larry Pennell, Edward G. Robinson, Martin Sheen, Barry Sullivan, Richard Thomas, Forrest Tucker, and Raquel Welch, who appeared as herself in the pilot episode.

Bracken's World aired on Friday at 10:00 pm (replacing the cancelled Star Trek), a day and time known as the "Friday night death slot", and was cancelled 15 episodes into its second season. "Had they done it like a continuing drama and focused on the regular characters", co-star Linda Harrison said in a 2001 interview, "it would have lasted longer. NBC, however, wanted a one-hour contained show, so they would stock each episode with a big guest star. After a while, you run out of story." The last episode of Bracken's World aired on Friday, December 25, 1970.

Cast of characters
 Warren Stevens as John Bracken (season one; voice only)
 Leslie Nielsen as John Bracken (season two)
 Eleanor Parker as Sylvia Caldwell (episodes 1-16)
 Bettye Ackerman as Anne Frazer (episodes 17-41)
 Elizabeth Allen as Laura Deane
 Dennis Cole as Davey Evans (season one)
 Jeanne Cooper as Grace Douglas
 Gary Dubin as Mark Grant
 Linda Harrison as Paulette Douglas
 Peter Haskell as Kevin Grant
 Karen Jensen as Rachel Holt
 Stephen Oliver as Tom Hudson (season one)
 Madlyn Rhue as Marjorie Grant (episodes 1-28)
 Laraine Stephens as Diane Waring

Tom Selleck was seen in the minor recurring role of Roger Haines in several season-one episodes; he made a guest appearance as a different character in season two.

Episodes

Season 1 (1969–70)

Season 2 (1970)

In popular culture
The show was mentioned in Mad Men: "Time Zones", when Megan Draper's agent told her she had received a call back for the Bracken's World pilot.

Awards and nominations

References

External links

Bracken's World at CVTA

1969 American television series debuts
1970 American television series endings
1960s American drama television series
1970s American drama television series
English-language television shows
NBC original programming
Television series about show business
Television series by 20th Century Fox Television
Television shows set in Los Angeles